Kenema District is a district in the Eastern Province of Sierra Leone. Its capital and largest city is Kenema, which is the third most populous city in Sierra Leone, after Freetown and Bo. Tongo is the second most populous city in the district. Other major towns in Kenema District include Blama and Yomboma. The district is the most populous district in the Eastern province with a population 609,873.

The District of Kenema borders Bo District to the west, the Republic of Liberia to the southeast, Tonkolili District and Kono District to the north, Kailahun District to the east, and Pujehun District to the southwest. The economy of Kenema District is largely based on Farming, Diamond mining and trade.

The Mende is the largest ethnic group in the district, though the district is home to a significant population of many of Sierra Leone"s ethnic groups. The population of Kenema District is majority Muslim, though the district is also home to a significant Christian minority. Like the rest of Sierra Leone, Muslims and Christians collaborate and get along very well in Kenema District.

Kenema District is a political stronghold of the Sierra Leone People's Party (SLPP). Since Independence in 1961 to present, the vast majority of the people of Kenema District support the Sierra Leone People's Party.

Kenema District is the home district of the current Chief Minister of Sierra Leone  
David J. Francis, who was born and raised in the city of Kenema. Kenema District is also the home district of Mohamed Kallon, who was born in the city of Kenema, and is widely regarded as the most famous Sierra Leonean footballer of all time.

Major towns
Kenema District has four cities with a population of at least 40,000
Kenema
Blama
Tongo
Yomboma

Government
Kenema District is governed with a district council form of government, which is headed by a District Council Chairman, who is the highest local government official in the district. The District Council Chairman is responsible for the general management of the district.  The District Council Chairman is elected directly by the residents of Kenema District every four years. The current District Council Chairman of Kenema District Council is Senesi Manssary of the Sierra Leone People's Party (SLPP), who easily won the 2012 District Chairperson election with 80.30%, defeating his main opponent Doris Saffa Nyangbe of the All People's Congress (APC) who took 15.49%.

Kenema  District is a reliable political stronghold of the Sierra Leone People's Party (SLPP), the main opposition party in Sierra Leone. The District overwhelmingly supports the SLPP by a large majority in Presidential, Parliamentary and local councils elections. The SLPP have won every Sierra leone presidential elections in the District by a large majority; including the 2012 Presidential election, when the SLPP presidential candidate Julius Maada Bio won 77.9% of the vote in the District, as he easily defeated the incumbent president Ernest Bai Koroma in the District who took only 18.7%.

Members of Parliament
Kenema District currently has eleven directly elected Representatives in the Sierra Leone House of Parliament; and ten of the eleven members belong to the Sierra Leone People's Party (SLPP).

Demographics of Kenema District
The estimated population of Kenema District was 515,461. Kenema District population is ethnically divers, although the Mende people make up the largest ethnic group. The district of Kenema enjoys religious plurality - Muslim and Christians. Since the emergence of the Second Liberian Civil War in 1999, Kenema District along with Bo District served more than 60,000 Liberian refugees

Economy
Kenema has a mixed economy, made up of gold and diamond mining as well as agricultural production of coffee, cacao and rice.

Sport
Kenema is home to Sierra Leonean Premier League club the Kamboi Eagles. The club won the Sierra Leonean FA Cup in 1981, 1985, and 2014.

Notable people from Kenema District
J. B. Dauda, Sierra Leone Minister of Finance
Mohamed Kallon, football star
Paul Kpaka, football star
Patrick Daniel Koroma, Bishop of Kenema
Andrew Lungay, Politician
Emmerson Bockarie, Musician

Administrative divisions

Chiefdoms
The district is made up of sixteen chiefdoms as the third level of administrative subdivision.

Dama – Giema
Dodo – Dodo
Gaura – Joru
Gorama Mende – Tungie
Kandu Leppiam – Gbado
Koya – Baoma
Langurama Ya – Baima
Lower Bambara – Panguma
Malegohun – Sembehun
Niawa – Sundumei
Nomo – Faama
Nongowa – Kenema
Simbaru – Boajibu
Small Bo – Blama
Tunkia – Gorahun
Wando – Faala

Major towns

Barma
Blama
Boajibu
Giehun
Gorahun
Hangha
Kenema, capital and largest city
Panguma
Pendemu
Tokpombu
Tongo, Second largest city
Wuima
Yomboma

References

External links
https://web.archive.org/web/20070121122533/http://www.statehouse-sl.org/member-parliament.html
 "Kenema District" at kenemadistrict.org
 Sierra Leone Encyclopedia (Final 2004 census data.)

Kenema
Eastern Province, Sierra Leone